Nesareh  or Nosareh or Nasreh, or Nossareh, also rendered as Natharah may refer to:
 Nesareh-ye Bozorg (نثاره), Khuzestan Province
 Nesareh-ye Kuchek (نثاره), Khuzestan Province
 Nesareh-ye Olya (نساره), Kurdistan Province
 Nesareh-ye Sofla (نساره), Kurdistan Province